Jørn Jeppesen  (21 April 1919 – 18 January 1964) was a Danish stage and film actor.

Filmography
Genboerne - 1939
Når bønder elsker - 1942
Natekspressen (P. 903) - 1942
Møllen - 1943
Guds mærkelige veje - 1944
De tre skolekammerater - 1944
Spurve under taget - 1944
En ny dag gryer - 1945
Så mødes vi hos Tove - 1946
Sikken en nat - 1947
Historien om Hjortholm - 1950
Café Paradis - 1950
Smedestræde 4 - 1950
Mosekongen - 1950
De røde heste - 1950
Det gamle guld - 1951
Nålen - 1951
Det sande ansigt - 1951
Husmandstøsen - 1952
Vejrhanen - 1952
En sømand går i land - 1954
Himlen er blå - 1954
Vores lille by - 1954
Altid ballade - 1955
Blændværk - 1955
Den kloge mand (1956) - 1956
Ung leg - 1956
En kvinde er overflødig - 1957
Bundfald - 1957
Skovridergården - 1957
Guld og grønne skove - 1958
Seksdagesløbet - 1958
Spion 503 - 1958
Det skete på Møllegården - 1960
Eventyrrejsen - 1960
Eventyr på Mallorca - 1961
Gøngehøvdingen - 1961
Der brænder en ild - 1962

External links

  Jørn Jeppesen at Danskefilm.dk

Danish male stage actors
Danish male film actors
20th-century Danish male actors
1919 births
1964 deaths
People from Frederiksberg
Burials at the Garrison Cemetery, Copenhagen